Best Shot is an American documentary series directed by Michael John Warren and starring Jay Williams. The series follows Newark Central High School's basketball team, showing the lives of the players and the fortunes of the team, as they are mentored by Williams. It premiered on July 18, 2018 on YouTube Premium. The series is executive produced by LeBron James, Maverick Carter, Andrew Fried, Dane Lillegard, Jordan Wynn, and Warren.

Premise
Best Shot follows Williams and "the lives of the students he hopes to inspire – as the ESPN analyst shares his journey from his championship college career at Duke to his post-crash loneliness and unsuccessful attempts at an NBA comeback – and mentors an inner-city high school team."

Production

Development
On November 20, 2017, it was announced that YouTube had given the production a series order consisting of eight episodes. Michael John Warren is set to direct the series from SpringHill Entertainment and Boardwalk Pictures in association with Blue Ribbon Content. LeBron James and Maverick Carter will executive produce alongside Andrew Fried, Dane Lillegard and Jordan Wynn of Boardwalk Pictures and Warren. Alongside the release of the series official trailer, it was confirmed that the series would premiere on July 18, 2018.

Marketing
Alongside the initial series announcement, YouTube released a teaser trailer for the series. On June 11, 2018, the official trailer for the series was released.

Episodes

References

External links

2010s American reality television series
English-language television shows
YouTube Premium original series
American non-fiction web series
Television series by Blue Ribbon Content
Television series by Boardwalk Pictures
2018 American television series debuts
2018 American television series endings